Brunellia macrophylla is a species of plant in the Brunelliaceae family. It is endemic to Colombia.

References

macrophylla
Endemic flora of Colombia
Vulnerable plants
Taxonomy articles created by Polbot